The 1992 Fountain Fire was a large and destructive wildfire in the U.S. state of California's Shasta County. After igniting on August 20 in an act of probable but unattributed arson, the fire was driven by strong winds and outpaced firefighters for two days while exhibiting extreme fire behavior such as long-range spotting, crown fire runs, and pyrocumulonimbus clouds that generated dry lightning. The fire consumed 63,960 acres and destroyed 636 structures (including more than 300 homes), primarily in the communities of Round Mountain and Montgomery Creek along the State Route 299 corridor. In 1992 the Fountain Fire was the third most destructive wildfire in recorded California history (though as of 2022 it no longer ranks among even the top 20 most destructive California wildfires), and at more than $22 million it was then also the most expensive fire to contain in recorded California history.

At the time the Fountain Fire was recognized not just as a major disaster, but also as a "fire of the future". The devastation the fire left as it moved through rural communities intermingled with private timberlands, in a difficult and high-stakes environment for firefighters, made it emblematic of the challenges faced by residents and responders alike in the wildland-urban interface. The Fountain Fire has been surpassed by more recent California wildfires in metrics for losses, but it remains notable for its speed, widespread destruction in multiple communities, and the long-term alteration of the landscape within its footprint.

Background factors 

Both long-term climatic patterns and short-term weather conditions combined to create an environment conducive to a large and uncontrollable wildfire in late August 1992. Between 1987 and 1992, California experienced a six-year drought in the state's first extended such period since the 1920s and 1930s. All six years ranked in the driest ten percent by runoff, and the stress on forests led to widespread bark beetle infestation.

Several weeks of high temperatures, at or exceeding  for 22 days, preceded the fire in Shasta County. There were also fewer than normal available firefighters due to an already-active fire season throughout California and the rest of the western United States; at the time many firefighters were tasked to the destructive Old Gulch Fire in Calaveras County.

Critical fire weather 
Lastly, a critical fire weather pattern developed for the portion of Northern California that included the Fountain Fire area. The influence of an upper-level trough moving onshore in the Pacific Northwest and a strong upper-level jet situated over Northern California created strong flow out of the southwest, and Foehn winds on the eastern slopes of the Cascade Range and the Sierra Nevada. Those winds also brought dry air, courtesy of the dry slot—a zone of clear, dry air which often accompanies low-pressure systems. The Northern California Geographical Coordination Center identifies this as a typical critical fire weather setup in northeastern California and the southern Cascades: "Pre-frontal conditions occur when strong, southwesterly or westerly winds are generated by the dry, southern tail of a rapidly moving cold front." In the Fountain Fire's vicinity on August 20, southwest winds were gusting up to 25 miles per hour.

Fire progression

August 20 
The Fountain Fire was first spotted by a fire lookout atop Hogback Mountain in the Shasta-Trinity National Forest at about 12:50 p.m. PDT on August 20. The lookout reported a smoke column behind a ridge, near a historic drinking fountain along Highway 299 (which gave the incident its name). The lookout could not see the actual ignition point of the growing fire, which was confirmed by the Shasta Bear Mountain lookout's cross-check to be about 2 miles from the fountain in dry grass off of Buzzard Roost Road, just west of Phillips Road and south of Highway 299. When a resident of Phillips Road spotted the fire shortly before 1:00 p.m., it was already 30 feet wide and had climbed into the tree canopy.

Resources attempt to stop the fire 
Firefighting resources were dispatched over the next 10 minutes; aircraft arrived overhead by 1:07 p.m., reporting that the fire was 2–3 acres and spreading north quickly, threatening structures within minutes. The first ground units arrived at 1:19 p.m., 29 minutes after the first report. The first two fire engines on scene were forced to defend a house that was under construction and at risk from blowing embers. Firefighters saved multiple homes, but the fire still grew rapidly. By 2:17 p.m. the Fountain Fire had burned 50 acres in its first 90 minutes, and at around 3:30 p.m. fire activity intensified further.

Officials were initially hopeful that they could hold the fire at Highway 299 outside of Round Mountain and keep it to less than 200 acres. They were nearly successful, but the high winds drove the fire into brush beneath power lines. The lines arced, causing nine simultaneous spot fires, and the firefighters were unable to keep the Fountain Fire from continuing towards and through Round Mountain. Round Mountain, Montgomery Creek, and the small subdivision of Moose Camp were all evacuated around 4:00 p.m. By 4:30 p.m., the fire had crossed Highway 299.

Fire behavior increases 
The Fountain Fire's northeastern push developed into an intense crown fire, with flame lengths of up to 300 feet that kept ground crews from safely engaging. The wind helped embers ignite spot fires at least 1 mile ahead of the main fire. The pyrocumulonimbus plume generated by the Fountain Fire reached at least 25,000 feet in altitude, as detected by weather radar in Medford, Oregon, and generated numerous lightning strikes. The 50–70 mph jet stream blowing out of the west created a chimney effect when it met the billowing smoke plume, ventilating the fire and increasing fire behavior.

A Forest Service meteorologist with California's Northern Operations Service Center speculated that, based on witness reports and debris, the fire may also have formed violent fire-generated vortices. A National Weather Service meteorologist in Redding assigned to the incident concurred, noting possible "fire tornadoes". Investigators found pine trees 2 to 3 feet in diameter snapped in half. Such vortices can rival low-end traditional tornados in size and strength, and multiple such strong vortices have been recorded in Northern California wildfires, including the 2014 Eiler Fire near Hat Creek and the infamous EF3 "fire tornado" produced by the 2018 Carr Fire on the outskirts of the city of Redding.

Fire burns through Round Mountain 
No one died or was severely injured when the fire front pushed through the town, but multiple people reported driving out through the flames or leaving their properties just before flames reached them.

By 5:00 p.m., fifteen people were trapped in an 80-acre meadow at the end of Frisby Road when they found the way out to Highway 299 blocked by flames. The McMillan family, ranchers and owners of the meadow property, had planned to go there in case of a fire and were able to both wet the area down with water trucks and flood it by blocking irrigation ditches. The group of people and vehicles remained there as the fire moved through with 200-foot flame lengths, blowing the roofs off of nearby barns with the force of its passage. Two men put out spot fires with a bulldozer. A helicopter looking for people who had not evacuated discovered the group, surrounded by flames. It was able to land and extricate two of the women and a 2-year-old child, but could not return. Firefighters could not safely reach the remaining people and evacuate them until 10:00 p.m., five hours after they took shelter.

Meanwhile, the fire continued moving north and east: by midnight, the fire had pushed further along the Highway 299 corridor and was south of Montgomery Creek. It had so far burned approximately 12,000 acres and forced between 1,000 and 2,000 people in the area to evacuate.

August 21 

The second day marked the single largest day of growth on the Fountain Fire, as similar weather conditions continued to fuel extreme fire behavior. At one point the fire was burning 80 acres every minute, and spreading at a rate of 6 miles per hour. This growth was also marked by more long-range spotting, of distances between 1/4 of a mile and 2 miles ahead of the fire.

In the morning, fire crews focused on protecting Montgomery Creek by attempting to stop one branch of the fire's advance at Fenders Ferry Road off of Highway 299, south of the community and north of Round Mountain. While firefighters were able to protect many structures along the road itself, they were unable to prevent the winds (a combination of continuing gusts from the southwest and inflow winds towards the Fountain Fire's massive plume to the east) from pushing flames across the road. This happened shortly after noon, and the fire then pressed towards Montgomery Creek. The fire entered the center of the community along Highway 299 by 3:00 p.m. Multiple homes were destroyed, but firefighters protected the local school, post office, and other major structures with assistance from aircraft.

Meanwhile, the larger head of the fire to the east continued advancing, forcing the communities of Big Bend, Hillcrest, and Moose Camp to be evacuated. Later that day, the fire burned through Moose Camp, another community of 60 summer cabins and other structures between Montgomery Creek and Burney off Highway 299, and left only about 20 remaining. By 6:00 p.m. on August 21, the larger town of Burney was placed under a voluntary evacuation advisory—California Highway Patrol officers used bullhorns to warn residents, and the Red Cross shelter that had been established because of the fire was also forced to move.

The fire moved so quickly and fiercely that firefighters did not expect to be able to stop it short of where the conifer forests gave way to old lava beds east of Burney. By dusk, the fire had advanced all the way to Hatchet Mountain and Hatchet Mountain Pass, damaging radio equipment on the mountain's summit. The flames were visible from Burney itself. By 10:00 p.m., the fire front was within 1.5 miles of the town, and had set a log deck on fire at Sierra Pacific Industries' mill on its western outskirts. However, once the Fountain Fire's flame front crested the hills west of Burney, it was no longer in alignment with the wind and up-slope terrain that had driven it along the Highway 299 corridor for the previous 36 hours. By midnight, the fire had burned more than 35,000 acres in total.

August 22 and beyond 
The Fountain Fire's behavior and growth over its first two days were sobering to firefighters. On August 22, the third day of the fire, Cal Fire deputy incident commander Bill Clayton predicted that the fire would grow to 100,000 acres. A Cal Fire memo posted for crews that same day read: "The fire has moved 7 miles in 6.5 hours the first day, faster the second day (Friday). Prepare for more of the same today. It is critically dry, fueled with variable winds, produced rapid fire runs and heavy spotting which ran out crews many times."

However, August 22 ended up bringing much more moderate weather conditions and fire behavior. Cooler temperatures and lighter winds allowed firefighters to gain ground. On the morning of August 22, firefighters lit backfires off of Highway 299 near Hatchet Mountain to prepare and strengthen control lines. By the end of the day, it was clear that the fire was progressing to the northeast of Burney and not towards it.

During the 22nd and 23rd, the flanks of the fire proved problematic: the fire moved northeast towards the Pit River, and southwest towards Oak Run and other communities. On August 23, fire crews and aircraft worked to stop the Fountain Fire from getting too close to the Pit River, citing both the steepness of the terrain beyond it, dense fuels, and the high resource values (such as old-growth forests and endangered spotted owl habitat) that would be at risk if it crossed. In that case, officials feared a "whole new ball game" with "uncontrollable" fire conditions. However, crews were aided by strong winds from the north, though the same winds made containing the fire difficult on its southern side closer to Oak Run. Residents of Round Mountain and Montgomery Creek were briefly allowed to return to their properties to assess the damage.

Before dawn on August 24, low humidity and winds of up to 25 miles per hour that had generated a red flag warning for much of Northern California also briefly caused the fire to become more active, jumping the fire line into the Cow Creek drainage. Some evacuation orders were issued again, including in Oak Run and Mill Creek, but the fire did not burn any more structures and by that afternoon it was 40% contained in all.

The winds failed to rematerialize on the 25th, and though weather remained hot and dry, crews continued to work on the fire's flanks. Firefighters constructed hand line in the Pit River canyon, in terrain too rugged for bulldozers and described by a Shasta-Trinity National Forest spokesperson as "steeper than a cow's face." At this point, Big Bend, Moose Camp, and Hillcrest were the only communities remaining under mandatory evacuation orders. Firefighters also reported re-burning and flare-ups of activity near unburned islands (ranging from 30 to 400 acres in size) of vegetation and structures within the fire. By midday August 26, the fire was 75% contained. On August 27 it remained hot and dry with calm winds.

On August 28, the Fountain Fire was declared 100% contained, having burned a total area just shy of 64,000 acres. However, firefighters continued to monitor 12,000 acres of unburned vegetation within the perimeter that risked reigniting, primarily on Hatchet Mountain and Lookout Mountain. The fire was officially declared controlled on November 1, and other fire suppression operations continued until mid-November.

Firefighting effort 

A deadlock between the Democratic California state legislature and Republican Governor Pete Wilson meant that the state was without a budget from July 1 to September 3 in 1992, and consequently unable to pay many state employees or contractors in anything but official IOUs during that period. These included Cal Fire firefighters, many of whom bought and wore T-shirts while working on the Fountain Fire that displayed the names of major fires, a "beleaguered firefighter" illustration, and the words "All this for an IOU?"

Additionally, on August 23 the Fountain Fire was reported to be short of 105 wildland firefighters—equivalent to seven handcrews—primarily because of resources taken up by the Old Gulch Fire in Calaveras County. There were also fewer replacements in part because the budget stalemate meant that fire departments throughout the state were in some cases unwilling to send their idle units, worried about potential budget cuts and the need to maintain their own operations in the face of uncertain funding and reimbursement.

At the peak of the suppression effort around 4,464 personnel, at least 600 of them California Conservation Camp Program prison inmates paid a dollar a day, worked to fight the fire. Firefighters worked shifts as long as 24 hours. The Shasta County fairgrounds in the town of Anderson, south of Redding, served as the main base camp for firefighters in the effort to contain the fire. On Sunday, August 23, air tankers dropped 212,000 gallons of fire retardant on the Fountain Fire, a then-record for the Forest Service air attack base in Redding. Aircraft, including Grumman S2Fs and Lockheed P-3 Orions dropped over 740,000 gallons of fire retardant in total, joined by at least 15 water-dropping helicopters and more than 470 vehicles involved in ground efforts. A Cal Fire official described the air attack fleet as "larger than the Peruvian Air Force." When suppression was complete, at more than $22 million, the Fountain Fire had become the then-most expensive fire to contain in recorded California history. At the time, the Fountain Fire was also the third most destructive wildfire in recorded California history, though it no longer ranks among the top 20 most destructive California wildfires.

Criticisms and responses 
Many residents who lost their homes in the Fountain Fire afterwards expressed criticisms of the firefighting effort. They stated that the firefighters should have cut more and larger fire lines between the flames and Montgomery Creek, and that crews did not defend structures that could have been saved. They also contended that many resources stood idle without orders for too long before engaging the fire or refused to engage at all. Multiple residents said they believed that their homes were destroyed in backfires set by firefighters in attempts to slow the main fire. A Cal Fire battalion chief was assaulted during the fire by a man who reportedly disagreed with the way it was being fought. Eventually, in November, more than 200 residents attended a meeting to air their disagreements over Cal Fire's efforts. Representatives for area politicians, including for U.S. House Representative Wally Herger, also attended.

Fire officials pushed back on these criticisms, asserting primarily that fire behavior was so intense that losses were unavoidable—many structures lay at the end of long driveways adjacent to heavy vegetation and could not have been safely protected. They also argued that without the context of internal communications, firefighters running out of water and leaving to get more was probably interpreted as them abandoning structures. Finally, they pointed to at least 228 structures that had been saved as evidence of success in the face of the severe conditions. One firefighter noted the challenges posed by the wildfire burning largely on private forest lands: in a national forest firefighters could build fire lines and conduct firing operations wherever they chose, but private ownership and power lines made those options more complicated in the Fountain Fire.

The Rural Fire Protection in America Steering Committee interviewed fire officials, though not local residents, and produced a report analyzing Cal Fire's initial mobilization for the Fountain Fire. The report was favorable, though it noted during the early stages of the fire radio frequencies were overloaded and firefighters generally lacked good information on which homes were defensible and which were not.

In March 1993, about 400 people attended a hearing held in Redding by the California State Senate Committee for Natural Resources and Wildlife on the Fountain Fire fight. That same month, Cal Fire also released its own internal report on the Fountain Fire. Issued by a 4-member committee of Northern California fire chiefs and officers, it interviewed 24 different fire officials (but no victims). The Cal Fire report was again mostly favorable to the agency, but listed several areas for improvement. It concluded that during the first 48 hours of the fire there were too few Cal Fire managers for the amount of equipment (the result of budget reductions and fires elsewhere), as well as serious communications issues. During the fire, 72 amateur ham radio operators had coordinated closely with Cal Fire and other agencies in the absence of telephone access. The report also criticized private firefighting equipment operators who showed up to the fire in hopes of being hired on the spot, causing confusion among Cal Fire officials who did not want responsibility for potentially unqualified operators. On the other hand, the committee report noted that 60% of the homes in the area of the Fountain Fire fell short of state standards for wildfire safety, including construction, brush clearance, and water access. The fire could not have been stopped given the windy conditions, most of the homes destroyed were indefensible, and the area was "a disaster waiting to happen", the report concluded.

Audit of effort 
In 1994, director of Cal Fire Richard A. Wilson ordered a series of state audits of the agency's spending on wildfires, prompted by an expensive fire season in the state in 1994–95. The first audit focused on the Fountain Fire. Some news articles seized on purchases made during the fire that were deemed extravagant, such as an order for more than 1,800 pounds of honey, as well as large bills for coffee, hotel rooms for firefighters, paperwork, and other goods and services. More systematically, the audit criticized the use of large and expensive helicopters and air tankers, and the disparity in compensation between very low-paid inmate firefighters (who did much of the difficult and dangerous physical labor on the fire line), and their correctional officers and supervisors.

Impacts

Casualties 
No deaths were directly caused by the fire itself. However, three loggers—Steve Horton Tyler, Melvin Bentley, and Donald Hendrickson—were killed in separate incidents during salvage logging operations after the fire; they are commemorated on a Fountain Fire historical marker. On October 15, Bentley was killed when he was struck by a partially-burned limb that fell from a tree as he took a break beneath it. On November 2, Hendrickson, a skidder operator, was hit by a snag and died after being airlifted to a Redding hospital. Tyler died almost a year later, on July 15, 1993, after being run over by a tractor he was operating. At least two other workers were seriously injured during Fountain Fire salvage logging, both of them struck in the head by trees that snapped back after being pinned down by other falling trees.

There were also at least 11 firefighter injuries sustained during the fire itself. One firefighter was struck by a falling branch, and another broke an ankle. The firefighter injuries also included at least 3 state prison inmates, 1 with a broken leg. Additionally, one firefighter was forced to deploy their fire shelter when overcome by flames while trying to protect a house, but whether they were injured was not reported. There were also substantial livestock losses, with entire herds of swine and cattle killed.

Closures and evacuations 
Highway 299 was closed from Oak Run in the west to Four Corners in the east, and Highway 89 was closed from Highway 44 in the south to Interstate 5 in the north. Highway 299 reopened on August 29, following the removal of hazardous trees and the replacement of around 300 burned guard rail posts. McArthur-Burney Falls Memorial State Park, home to Burney Falls, was closed when the evacuation warning for Burney was issued and thereafter used as a camp for firefighters. In total, more than 7,500 people were forced to evacuate because of the Fountain Fire. At least two Shasta County residents were convicted of burglary for looting a home in Oak Run while it was under evacuation.

Damage 
The fire destroyed 636 structures. Homes accounted for 330 of them, with the remainder being commercial structures and outbuildings, such as barns or sheds. Another 78 homes were damaged. The fire burned part of the elementary school in Round Mountain, including its auditorium and library. The Hill Country Community Clinic also burned down, leaving the nearest physician 30 miles away in Redding. The California Office of Emergency Services (OES) preliminarily estimated the cost of the Fountain Fire's damage to private property at $105.6 million. This estimate—made the day the fire was contained—included almost $18 million in residential losses, almost $2 million in commercial losses, and $86 million in timber losses. At the time, the Fountain Fire was the third most destructive wildfire in recorded California history (after the Oakland firestorm of 1991 and the 1990 Painted Cave Fire in Santa Barbara), though as of 2022 it no longer ranks among the top 20 most destructive California wildfires.

The communities affected were already economically vulnerable before the fire; as much as 90% of the populations of Round Mountain, Montgomery Creek, and nearby areas relied on some sort of public assistance. Jobs were often seasonal or dependent on tourism. The Red Cross estimated that 3/4ths of all those who lost their homes in the fire lacked insurance.

The fire also temporarily damaged much of rural Shasta County's basic infrastructure. More than 150,000 feet of telephone cable operated by Citizens Utilities was burned, and PG&E was forced to replace 45,000 feet of electrical distribution lines, repair 150 miles of transmission lines, and replace approximately 300 wooden power line poles that had burned. All of eastern Shasta County had lost power when the Fountain Fire burned the Cedar Creek PG&E substation in Round Mountain.

At the time, fire officials highlighted the Fountain Fire as a "fire of the future", connecting the destruction of the wildfire to California's growing population, particularly in the wildland-urban interface. By 1992, more than 1,000 building permits were being issued every year outside of cities and towns in Shasta County. Firefighters recalled having to defend structures in the path of the Fountain Fire when it was still a small incident, instead of suppressing the fire directly. Firefighters also emphasized the lack of sufficient vegetation clearance around most structures in the fire's path.

An article ran in the Paradise Post two weeks after the Fountain Fire, noting that the city of Paradise, California was susceptible to an similar wind-driven wildfire, with its comparable geography, fuels, and climate. In 2018 most of Paradise burned to the ground in an urban firestorm when the Camp Fire blew through, fueled by strong winds, killing 85 people and destroying more than 18,000 structures in California's deadliest and most destructive wildfire ever recorded.

Environmental impacts 
The smoke plume from the Fountain Fire gradually drifted southwest over the Bay Area and California coast, including Sonoma, Mendocino, Lake, and Napa counties: enough so that it prompted calls to firefighters from people who thought there was a local fire. On August 22 and 23 fire departments in Santa Cruz, Scotts Valley, and elsewhere received hundreds of calls about the smoke.

Various local species were threatened by the fire. The fire approached critical habitat for the endangered and protected northern spotted owl and California Spotted Owl. The fire also threatened the only known populations of the Shasta snow-wreath, a rare deciduous shrub that was only recognized as an undiscovered species by botanists in May 1992, just months before the Fountain Fire—however, the plants survived. A state biologist for the Department of Fish and Game predicted potential major impacts on local fish populations.

In a report for the Forest Foundation that advocated for thinning and post-fire replanting, retired forestry professor Thomas M. Bonnicksen used a Forest Carbons And Emissions Model (FCEM) to calculate that more than 13 million tons of carbon dioxide were released through combustion and decay in the Fountain Fire—equivalent to more than 17% of annual passenger vehicle emissions in California in 2005. However, the report received pushback: it was never peer-reviewed, and California Air Resources Board and Forest Service officials critiqued the report as probably overestimating the amount of emissions. Other critics noted Bonnicksen's alignment with the timber industry.

Political impacts 
Shasta County Sheriff Jim Pope declared a local emergency because of the Fountain Fire on August 21, the day after the fire had begun and burned through Round Mountain. On the same day, Governor of California Pete Wilson declared a state of emergency in Shasta County. On August 22, U.S. House Representative Wally Herger toured the disaster area and called for a federal disaster declaration from President George H. W. Bush. President Bush then authorized federal relief for Shasta County on August 29. Additionally, Shasta County and the Federal Emergency Management Agency (FEMA) agreed to drop all fees for fire victims seeking to rebuild their homes, and the agency funded an additional building inspector specifically for rebuilding efforts in the fire area for 18 months. Then the Democratic Party U.S. Senate candidate, Dianne Feinstein visited Redding on September 1 for her campaign, receiving a briefing at the incident command post in Anderson followed by a tour of the fire's footprint via helicopter.

Post-fire landscape 

Before the Fountain Fire, the predominating forest cover type was Sierra Nevada mixed conifer, with Pacific Ponderosa pine cover at lower elevations. Tree species present included ponderosa pine, sugar pine, Douglas fir, white fir, incense-cedar, and California black oaks, while the understory was dominated by manzanita and ceanothus species. However, the fire largely burned at a high severity, and killed much of the vegetation within its footprint.

In the weeks after the fire, Cal Fire conducted reseeding operations via helicopter, spreading 42 tons of native grass seeds over more than 5,000 acres of the fire footprint most prone to erosion. Timber companies built stream buffers and check dams in vulnerable waterways. Erosion concerns were borne out when a large autumn storm at the end of October brought rockslides and debris down onto Highway 299 in the burn area, temporarily blocking the roadway. The following spring, rain on the hydrophobic soil (ash leaving it unable to absorb water) allowed water to run off, carving deep gullies, carrying off topsoil, and washing out roads across the county.

Salvage logging 
Most of the area burned by the Fountain Fire was privately owned. Of the nearly 64,000 acres burned, 41% (more than 25,000 acres) belonged to Roseburg Forest Products, 15% (more than 9,000 acres) to Sierra Pacific Industries, and 9% to Fruit Growers Supply. 34% belonged to small private landowners, and 1% belonged to state or federal agencies. In total, 41,300 acres of the burn area were under industrial ownership.

California's Forest Practices Act permits timber companies to quickly harvest burned trees in a practice called salvage logging without the usual thorough timber harvest plans that they are usually required to submit to the state. Salvage logging is a environmentally controversial but profitable enterprise for timber companies. After the Fountain Fire, Roseburg was able to keep open multiple sawmills in Northern California to process the salvaged wood, temporarily saving hundreds of jobs and prolonging the mills' lives by months when they had previously been slated to close over new environmental restrictions on logging public lands. By the end of the salvage logging effort in 1993, 600 million board feet of timber had been harvested from the burned trees, as well as 913,000 tons of wood chips for biomass power plant fuel.

Native land dispute 
In 1977, 10 families belonging to the Pit River Tribe of Native Americans occupied Smith Camp (a defunct logging camp), claiming ancestral rights to the surrounding land. Roseburg Forest Products, which acquired the land in 1979 from another logging company, left the group undisturbed in the hopes that they would eventually leave. When the Fountain Fire burned through the area, it also destroyed the structures at Smith Camp, and Roseburg refused to authorize FEMA to place trailers there for the Native group to live in while they rebuilt. Roseburg also sought to conduct salvage logging operations on the land, and was resisted. The Native Americans demanded the legal title to the Smith Camp property, supported by the Pit River Tribal Council.

Herbicide application and replanting 
Roseburg and the other timber companies sprayed the land slated for replanting with herbicides, such as hexazinone, intended to suppress brush growth that might compete with the replanted conifer saplings. Local residents organized a rally at a creek in the proposed spraying area with more than 100 attendees, worried about potential environmental contamination and side effects of the herbicides. Company officials dismissed concerns, arguing that the chemicals were known to be safe.

Logging companies began to replant in the spring of 1993, about 7 months after the fire, and those efforts continued for 5 years. Roseburg planted "a combination of ponderosa pine, Douglas-fir, and white fir with 10-ft spacing." The scale of the replanting was significant: Roseburg Forest Industries planted 10 million seedlings, Sierra Pacific Industries planted 3 million, and Fruit Growers Supply Co. and W.M. Beaty and Associates planted the remaining 4 million, for a total of 17 million seedlings replanted in the burn area. The replanted trees are estimated to reach maturity at 100 feet in height by 2065, although the growing forest is less varied than the second-growth forest that burned in the fire.

Fountain Wind Project concerns 
Wildfire concerns in the Fountain Fire's former footprint also helped sink a large and controversial wind farm project proposed for timberland property west of Burney and north of Highway 299. Known as the Fountain Wind project and proposed by energy firm ConnectGEN LLC, the project would have included up to 71 wind turbines, 679 feet tall, with the capacity to generate 216 megawatts of electricity.

The project's location within a high wildfire hazard zone, as evidenced by the Fountain Fire, was cited by residents opposed to the project as a reason to not approve the project. Residents argued that the turbines could be a potential ignition source (either through malfunctions or by attracting lightning), would require significant vegetation clearance, and would make aerial firefighting more difficult. Officials with the Fountain Wind project argued that it would serve as a large-scale fuel break between the communities along Highway 299. A report by Shasta County's fire chief noted that the turbines would present a challenge for aerial firefighting operations, but would not prevent them. It also described the help that the access roads cleared of vegetation would provide to crews. Other wildfire concerns centered around the risks posed by new electrical equipment, an issue heightened by the fatal Camp and Zogg fires, both caused by malfunctioning PG&E equipment.

In 2021, the Shasta County Planning Commission voted unanimously to reject the project's use permit, followed by an appeal to the Shasta County Board of Supervisors that similarly resulted in a 4–1 vote to deny the appeal. Wildfire risks and firefighting challenges, among other issues, were given as a primary reason for the rejection of the project.

Cause 
Investigators pinpointed the precise spot where the fire started, using forensic techniques that even included examining the "pattern of charring on cow patties". They used satellite data to confirm that there had been no recent lightning strikes nearby, and traffic patterns to rule out a hot catalytic converter or sparks from car exhaust. Ground crews had found no downed power lines at the site; nor indeed was any ignition source found at the site of the fire's origin, including any match, cigarette butt, or exhaust carbon from machinery.

These methods led investigators to announce on August 25 that the cause of the Fountain Fire was probable arson. A Cal Fire spokesperson declared that "The probability is that someone used a match or cigarette lighter to ignite the fire and took it with them." Secret Witness, a non-profit organization, offered a $10,000 reward for information leading to the arrest and conviction of anyone responsible. Cal Fire fire prevention officer Paul Bertagna said that investigators followed about 50 leads, with none leading to an arrest. The statute of limitations for prosecuting the hypothetical act of arson expired three years later in 1995, though Cal Fire said then that it would continue investigating, with a spokesperson noting that "If a person has ignited one fire, they may have lit them before or they may light them later." A new arson statute with harsher penalties and a longer statute of limitations was enacted in 1994 in California, but did not apply retroactively to the Fountain Fire.

No precise motive or perpetrator was ever determined, though one federal prosecutor in 1994 told the Sacramento Bee he believed it was economic arson committed by someone intending to make money from the fire suppression effort. This was a motive linked to several other fires in Northern California at the time, some of which resulted in indictments.

See also 
Other notable arson-caused and/or destructive wildfires in Shasta County:
 Ponderosa Fire (2012)
 Clover Fire (2013)
 Salt Fire (2021)
 Fawn Fire (2021)

References 

Wildfires in Shasta County, California
California wildfires caused by arson
August 1992 events in the United States
1992 meteorology
1990s wildfires in the United States
1992 in California
1992 natural disasters in the United States